Hastilude is a generic term used in the Middle Ages to refer to many kinds of martial games.  The word comes from the Latin hastiludium, literally "lance game".  By the 14th century, the term usually excluded tournaments and was used to describe the other games collectively; this seems to have coincided with the increasing preference for ritualistic and individualistic games over the traditional mêlée style.

Today, the most well-known of the hastiludes are the tournament, or tourney, and the joust, but over the medieval period a number of other games and sports developed, which differed in popularity and rules from area to area, and from period to period. Distinction was made between the different types by contemporaries in their description, laws, prohibitions, and customs.

Types of hastiludes

Joust

In contrast to the tournament, which comprised teams of large numbers ranging over large tracts of land, the joust was fought between two individuals on horseback, in a small, defined ground often known as the lists. The two would ride at each other from opposite ends, charging with a couched lance. In the early fifteenth century, a barrier was introduced to keep the horses apart, to avoid collisions.  

More informal jousting events would have several horsemen within the lists at once, where each waited to take up the challenge of another, although the aim remained for the joust to be a one-on-one duel.  

There were several types of joust, including some regional preferences or rules.  For example, in fourteenth-century Germany, distinction was made between the Hohenzeuggestech, where the aim was to break the lance, and the Scharfrennen, where knights sought to unhorse their opponents.  These types called for different lances (light in the former, heavy in the latter), and saddles (where the Scharfrennen called for saddles without front or rear supports, which would impede the fall).

Jousts originally developed out of the charge at the beginning of the mêlée, but by the thirteenth century had become quite distinct from the tourney. That it was seen as a separate event, with its own rules and customs, is clear from historical documents such as Edward II of England's 1309 ban of all forms of hastilude except the joust. By the nature of its duel, and the discrete space required for the action, the joust became a popular spectator and ceremonial sport, with elaborate rituals developing around the whole event.

Pas d'armes

The pas d'armes''' or passage of arms was a type of chivalric hastilude that evolved in the late 14th century and remained popular through the 15th century. It involved a knight or group of knights ( or "holders") who would stake out a traveled spot, such as a bridge or city gate, and let it be known that any other knight who wished to pass (venants or "comers") must first fight, or be disgraced. If a traveling venant did not have weapons or horse to meet the challenge, one might be provided, and if the venan chose not to fight, he would leave his spurs behind as a sign of humiliation. If a lady passed unescorted, she would leave behind a glove or scarf, to be rescued and returned to her by a future knight who passed that way.

Mêlée and behourdBehourd, buhurt and mêlée (the latter term being modern) refer to a class of hastiludes that involve groups of fighters simulating cavalry combat. This type of game formed the core of the tournament during the high medieval period.

Quintain

The quintain (from Latin quintana, a street between the fifth and sixth maniples of a camp, where warlike exercises took place), also known as pavo (or peacock), may have included a number of lance games, often used as training for jousting, where the competitor would attempt to strike an object with a lance.  The common object was a shield or board on a pole (usually referred to, confusingly, as 'the quintain'), although a mannequin was sometimes used.  While the use of horses aided in training for the joust, the game could be played on foot, using a wooden horse or on boats (popular in 12th-century London).

Tupinaire
The tupinaire is a duel between two knights, but rather than conducting three passes, each of the three duels are fought until one knight has received three solid blows from their opponent. While frequently referred to by contemporary sources, and included (separately) in various prohibitions and declarations over the medieval period, little is known about the nature of the tupinaire.  It is clearly a hastilude, or wargame, of some kind, and distinct from the other types, but there seems to be no clear description of its rules.

Notes

References
 Barker, Juliet (1986) The Tournament in England: 1100–1400'', UK: Boydell Press 

Medieval culture
Combat sports
Historical European martial arts
Chivalry